Waves and Instabilities from a Neutral Dynamo or WINDY is space experiment mission for the purpose to study a phenomenon that occurs in the ionosphere – a layer of charged particles in the upper atmosphere.

Mission 
WINDY is a NASA rocket mission that hopes to study disturbances in the upper atmosphere that might interfere with communication and technology systems. The experiment will form night-time white artificial clouds that will be visible by residents of the Republic of the Marshall Islands during two rocket flights. The rockets were launched September 9, 2017.

References 

Ionosphere
NASA programs